

302001–302100 

|-bgcolor=#f2f2f2
| colspan=4 align=center | 
|}

302101–302200 

|-bgcolor=#f2f2f2
| colspan=4 align=center | 
|}

302201–302300 

|-bgcolor=#f2f2f2
| colspan=4 align=center | 
|}

302301–302400 

|-bgcolor=#f2f2f2
| colspan=4 align=center | 
|}

302401–302500 

|-bgcolor=#f2f2f2
| colspan=4 align=center | 
|}

302501–302600 

|-id=542
| 302542 Tilmann ||  || Tilmann Arne Meyer (born 2006), son of German discoverer Maik Meyer || 
|}

302601–302700 

|-id=652
| 302652 Hauke ||  || Hauke Christoph Meyer (born 2011), son of German discoverer Maik Meyer || 
|}

302701–302800 

|-bgcolor=#f2f2f2
| colspan=4 align=center | 
|}

302801–302900 

|-id=849
| 302849 Richardboyle ||  || Richard Boyle (born 1943), an astronomer at the Vatican Observatory. He is an expert in high-precision photometry of stars and stellar clusters. His work includes asteroseismology and the discoveries of minor planets using the Vatican Advanced Technology Telescope at Mount Graham, Arizona, United States. || 
|}

302901–303000 

|-id=932
| 302932 Francoballoni ||  || Nicola Franco Balloni (born 1950), an Italian diplomat and scholar. || 
|}

References 

302001-303000